Many of the tropes of science fiction can be viewed as similar to the goals of transhumanism. Science fiction literature contains many positive depictions of technologically enhanced human life, occasionally set in utopian (especially techno-utopian) societies. However, science fiction's depictions of technologically enhanced humans or other posthuman beings frequently come with a cautionary twist. The more pessimistic scenarios include many dystopian tales of human bioengineering gone wrong.

Examples of "transhumanist fiction" include novels by Linda Nagata, Greg Egan, and Hannu Rajaniemi. Transhuman novels are often philosophical in nature, exploring the impact such technologies might have on human life. Nagata's novels, for example, explore the relationship between the natural and artificial, and suggest that while transhuman modifications of nature may be beneficial, they may also be hazardous, so should not be lightly undertaken. Egan's Diaspora explores the nature of ideas such as reproduction and questions if they make sense in a post-human context. Rajaniemi's novel, while more action oriented, still explores themes such as death and finitude in post-human life.

Fictional depictions of transhumanist scenarios are also seen in other media, such as movies (Transcendence), television series (the Ancients of Stargate SG-1), manga and anime (Ghost in the Shell), role-playing games (Rifts and Eclipse Phase) and video games (Deus Ex or BioShock).

Transhumanist literature

History 
Among the earliest works to portray transhumanism is the story of Frankenstein or The Modern Prometheus. Victor himself is an early transhumanist character, attempting to overcome death through chemistry. The moral of the story is that man should not try to play God, serving as a criticism of the values of the transhumanist ideology that science and technology can be used to overcome the human condition. Following Mary Shelley's work, several of the stories by H. G. Wells also address this theme. The Invisible Man and The Island of Doctor Moreau both involve scientific men whose failed experiments in tampering with nature result in the story's conflict.

The cyberpunk genre is heavily influenced by transhumanism, generally criticizing the use of technology to improve human life by showing the consequences resulting in its misuse. Works such as Neuromancer, Do Androids Dream of Electric Sheep?, and the manga series Akira, all demonstrate worlds unbridled with technological advancement to improve the human race, used to reinforce divides among social classes. The idea of high-tech, low-life, results in rampant poverty frequently exploited by an upper-class made immortal through cybernetic enhancement. Author and academic Robert M. Geraci states that cyberpunk as a genre attempts to caution against transhumanism by exposing the problematic elements of the social economy that supports it.

Notable transhumanist authors

 Neal Asher
 Margaret Atwood
 Iain M. Banks
 Kage Baker
 Stephen Baxter
 Greg Bear
 Gregory Benford
 Marshall Brain
 David Brin
 Octavia Butler
 Ted Chiang
 Arthur C. Clarke
 Philip K. Dick
 Cory Doctorow
 Jacek Dukaj
 Greg Egan
 Warren Ellis
 Peter F Hamilton
 Michel Houellebecq
 Aldous Huxley
 Stanisław Lem
 C. S. Lewis
 Ken MacLeod
 Richard K. Morgan
 Ramez Naam
 Yuri Nikitin
 Richard Powers
 Adam Renzema
 Alastair Reynolds
 John Scalzi
 Dan Simmons
 David Simpson
 Olaf Stapledon
 Neal Stephenson
 Bruce Sterling
 Charles Stross
 John C. Wright

Transhumanist novels

In television and film

The science fiction film genre has always had a hand in exploring transhumanism and the ethics and implications surrounding it. In the first two decades of the twenty-first century, however, there has been a surge of films and television shows focusing on the superhero genre. There are many superheroes whose stories are propelled or entirely result from dealings with transhumanism. From Iron Man to The Batman saga, there have been plenty of heroes who did not receive their powers naturally, and therefore represent the great leap human beings may take into improving their own condition.

Additionally, because these films represent the most popular trend in the medium today, they indeed represent a glimpse into the ideological shift of western culture as a whole. The fixation on normal men and women improving themselves artificially seems to have become a very widely accepted and celebrated idea.

 2001: A Space Odyssey
 The 4400
 2B
 Agents of S.H.I.E.L.D.
 Akira
 Alphas
 Altered Carbon
 Andromeda
 Avatar
 Battlestar Galactica
 Beneath the Planet of the Apes
 Bicentennial Man
 Bio Booster Armor Guyver
 Blade Runner
 Blade Runner 2049
 Brainstorm
 Caprica
 Chappie
 Childhood's End
 Crest of the Stars
 Cyborg
 Dark Angel
 Dark City
 District 9
 Doctor Who
 Elysium
 Ex Machina
 Fringe
 Galatea 2.2
 Galaxy Express 999
 Gattaca
 Ghost in the Shell
 Her
 Heroes
 H+ (a web series)
 Humans
 Interstellar
 Jupiter Ascending
 Kamen Rider Build
 The Lawnmower Man
 Limitless
 Lucy
 The Matrix franchise
 The Melancholy of Haruhi Suzumiya
 Mobile Suit Gundam
 Mutant X
 Neon Genesis Evangelion
 Ninja Robots
 Orphan Black
 The Outer Limits episodes:
 "The Sixth Finger"
 Pacific Rim
 Powder
 Power Rangers Operation Overdrive
 Power Rangers RPM
 Prometheus
 RoboCop franchise
 Stargate SG-1
 Star Trek: The Original Series:
 "Where No Man Has Gone Before"
 "Charlie X"
 "Miri"
 "What Are Little Girls Made Of?"
 "Space Seed"
 "Metamorphosis"
 "Spock's Brain"
 "Is There in Truth No Beauty?"
 "Plato's Stepchildren"
 Star Trek: The Next Generation
 "Hide and Q"
 "The Nth Degree
 "Q Who", "The Best of Both Worlds" and "I, Borg"
 Star Wars
 Strange Days
 Terminator Salvation
 Texhnolyze
 Transcendence
 Tron franchise
 Episodes of The X Files 
 "Killswitch"
 Watchmen
 X-Men
 Years and Years

In comics or graphic novels

 Akira
 Battle Angel Alita/Gunm
 The webcomic Dresden Codak stars a transhuman cyborg named Kimiko Ross who augments her body over the course of the strip's stories.
 The comic Transmetropolitan is about a transhuman society several centuries in the future that includes many cyborgs, uploaded humans, and genetically modified mutants.
 The dystopian graphic novels Upgrade and Monkey Room by Louis Rosenberg convey satirical views on the human march towards singularity.

In musicals
 Be More Chill

In video games

 BioShock series
 Call of Duty: Black Ops III
 Crysis series
 Cyberpunk 2077
 Detroit: Become Human
 Deus Ex series
 Half-Life
 Halo
 Metal Gear Rising: Revengeance
 Nier: Automata
 Read Only Memories
 Shadowrun series
 SOMA
 System Shock series
 Wolfenstein series

In table-top games
 The role playing game Eclipse Phase takes transhumanism to a post-apocalyptic horror setting in which Seed Artificial Intelligences have gone rogue, introducing itself with the slogan "Your mind is software. Program it. – Your body is a shell. Change it. – Death is a disease. Cure it. – Extinction is approaching. Fight it."
 The GURPS Supplement Transhuman Space deals with a closer transhumanist future of our solar system, describing a role playing game setting "in the year 2100".
 Another prominent example is the Warhammer 40,000 universe; Games Workshop's longstanding tabletop strategy franchise, which includes several video games and dozens of novels. While usually focusing on concepts like the loss of technology and the death of knowledge, and nowhere near what could be called a "utopia", the Warhammer 40,000 universe does depict a setting where transhumanism and even posthumanism are both quite widespread. Cybernetic and genetic modifications, human-machine interfaces, self-aware computer "spirits" (advanced AIs), ubiquitous space travel and even true posthuman "gods" are all quite prominent and featured throughout. The main protagonists of many novels and campaigns, the Imperial Space Marines, are normal human men who have been so vastly augmented and changed by technology that they are no longer Homo sapiens but a different new species. One of major playable factions, the alien Necrons, have completely transformed their bodies into ageless robot bodies tens of millions of years before the setting's main events. A faction allied with the Imperium, the Cult of Mechanicus, is a religious organization of machine worshippers, who treat cybernetic augmentation as a form of ascension. Unlike many transhuman futures depicted by authors on the subject however, Warhammer 40,000 is bleak, violent and filled with war and even with the existence of posthuman "gods" (like the Emperor of Mankind or his Primarchs) humanity is still beset on all sides by threats—including those of actual, supernatural gods.

See also

 Biopunk
 Cyborgs in fiction
 Genetic engineering in science fiction
 Postcyberpunk
 Superhumans in fiction
 Uplifting in science fiction
 Utopian and dystopian fiction

References

Further reading

External links
 List of transhumanist books

 
Biopunk
Cyberpunk themes
Postcyberpunk
Science fiction themes